Alfred C. Ulmer Jr. (1916-2000) was an American intelligence officer. He was born in Jacksonville, Florida in August 1916.  He was of Swiss extraction on his father's side, his father having been born in Zurich. Ulmer graduated from Princeton University in 1939 and joined the United States Navy prior to the start of World War II, ultimately becoming a major head of intelligence operations during World War II.  He married Doris Gibson Bridges and had three sons (Alfred III, James and Nicolas) and a daughter (Marguerite).   He received the Intelligence Medal of Merit when he retired from his position in 1962.  Ulmer then went on to business and in the 1980s joined the Swiss banking firm Lombard Odier et Cie. in Geneva, later setting up Lombard Odier's operations in Bermuda. He died on June 22, 2000 in Virginia Beach, Virginia.

Career in intelligence
Ulmer began his career in intelligence as a major head of intelligence operations for the Navy during World War II.  He then joined the Office of Strategic Services (OSS) in 1945 and oversaw operatives gathering information in Turkey, Egypt, Italy and Austria.

When the OSS was disbanded in 1945, Ulmer became head of the Strategic Services Unit (SSU) in Austria. There, Ulmer expanded his base of operations to include the whole Balkans area including such controversial places as Yugoslavia and Hungary. Although the SSU lacked the personnel to effectively carry out covert operations, Ulmer pushed for more money and was finally rewarded by a $150,000 annual budget.  His glory at the SSU was short lived though as the SSU was soon liquidated into the CIA by the new Central European Section chief, Richard Helms.

Ulmer was promoted to chief of the Far East division of the CIA's Directorate of Plans in 1955. At his new position Ulmer coordinated the overthrow of the president of Indonesia (Sukarno) in 1957.  The main reason behind the rebellion was to rid Indonesia of its growing Communist Party. Ulmer was criticized for the failure of the rebellion and its intended sequel.  He worked in Athens from 1952 to 1955 and in Paris from 1958 to 1962. Ulmer later went into business in London.

Ulmer and his wife, Doris, are mentioned in the 1994 memoirs of Barbara Bush, the wife of former president George Herbert Walker Bush, who had served in Naval Intelligence and was in 1963 still covertly serving in the CIA even while running for office. She quotes from an otherwise unattested letter of November 22, 1963, addressed to "Dearest family," which begins 
Wednesday I took Doris Ulmer out for lunch. They were here from England and they had been so nice to George in Greece. ... I am writing this at the Beauty Parlor and the radio says that the President has been shot. ... Poppy [G.H.W. Bush's nickname] picked me up at the beauty parlor—we went right to the airport, flew to Ft. Worth and dropped Mr. Zeppo off (we were on his plane) and flew back to Dallas.
"Mr. Zeppo" was Joe Zeppa, protégé of the Rockefeller family and owner of the hotel in which Bush made his campaign speech that day. When his son Keating was 
told that the plane bypassed Dallas's downtown Love Field, dropped Zeppa off at Fort Worth's municipal airport, and then backtracked to Dallas, [he] said that was not something that his father ordinarily would have done.This and other documentary evidence is adduced by Baker (op. cit.) in an attempt to account for why G.H.W. Bush, perhaps alone among all Americans alive at the time, always said he could not remember where he was on the day of the Kennedy assassination. "In 1994, three decades after Poppy began not remembering where he was on November 22, 1963, it was suddenly Barbara who remembered." (Op. cit. p. 52.)

Awards

Intelligence Medal of Merit

Bibliography

Notes

References
https://www.nytimes.com/2000/07/01/world/alfred-c-ulmer-jr-83-officer-in-us-intelligence-agencies.html
https://web.archive.org/web/20070624113719/http://webscript.princeton.edu/~paw/memorials/memdisplay.php?id=6779
https://books.google.com/books?id=VAbkogswOmEC&pg=PA59

1916 births
Princeton University alumni
People of the Central Intelligence Agency
2000 deaths
Recipients of the Intelligence Medal of Merit
United States Navy personnel of World War II
Military personnel from Florida
People from Jacksonville, Florida